Tkachenko is a common Ukrainian surname.  Tkachenko is the central and eastern Ukrainian version of the western Ukrainian surname Tkachuk, meaning "weaver". Like other Ukrainian names ending in -ko or -chenko, their heritage is rooted in the Polyans tribe that lived near modern-day Kyiv.

It may refer to:
 Darya Tkachenko (born 1983), Ukrainian draughts player
 Elena Tkachenko (born 1983), Belarusian gymnast
 Heorhy Tkachenko (1898–1993), Ukrainian bandurist
 Igor Tkachenko (1964–2009), Russian military pilot
 Ilia Tkachenko (born 1986), Russian ice dancer
 Ivan Tkachenko (disambiguation), multiple individuals
 Leonid Tkachenko (disambiguation), multiple individuals
 Maryna Tkachenko (born 1965), Ukrainian basketball player
 Nadiya Tkachenko (born 1948), Soviet-Ukrainian pentathlete
 Oleksandr Tkachenko (disambiguation), multiple individuals from Ukraine
 Pavel Tcacenco (died 1926), Romanian communist
 Petro Tkachenko (1878–1919), Ukrainian kobzar
 Sergey Tkachenko (born 1999), Kazakhstani ski jumper
 Serhiy Tkachenko (born 1979), Ukrainian footballer
 Viacheslav Tkachenko (born 1973), Ukrainian figure skater
 Vladimir Tkachenko (born 1957), Soviet basketball player
 Volodymyr Tkachenko (disambiguation), multiple individuals from Ukraine

See also
 
 Tcacenco
 Tkach
 Tkachuk

External links
 Today's Ukrainian surnames of Northern Donechchyna

Occupational surnames
Ukrainian-language surnames
Surnames of Ukrainian origin